Buk-gu Office Station is a station of the Daegu Metro Line 3 in Wondae-dong, Seo District, Daegu, South Korea.

External links
 
  Cyber station information from Daegu Metropolitan Transit Corporation

Daegu Metro stations
Seo District, Daegu
Daegu Metro Line 3
Railway stations opened in 2015